Oscar Matthew "Battling" Nelson (June 5, 1882 – February 7, 1954), was a Danish-born American professional boxer who held the World Lightweight championship. He was also nicknamed "the Durable Dane".

Personal history
Nelson was born Oscar Mathæus Nielsen in Copenhagen, Denmark, on June 5, 1882. He emigrated to the United States the following year and was raised in Hegewisch, a neighborhood on the Southeast side of Chicago.

In 1913, he married Fay King, a cartoonist who did his portrait for Nelson's 1911 guide The Wonders of the Yellowstone National Park. In 1916, they had a very public divorce.

Nelson died February 7, 1954, in Chicago, Illinois, from lung cancer. The Veteran Boxing Association paid for part of the cost of his funeral; his ex-wife paid the remainder, in addition to purchasing "beautiful arrangements" for the ceremony.

Boxing career
Nelson began boxing professionally at age fourteen, in 1896. He fought for the vacant lightweight title against Jimmy Britt on December 20, 1904, but lost a twenty-round decision. He lost to Abe Attell in 1905, but his win over Jack O'Neill secured him another shot at the world championship. On September 9, 1905, Nelson finally beat Britt in a knockout in the 18th round of a 45-round bout

He defeated Terry McGovern in a no decision Newspaper decision, but then faced a greater challenge when he was given the opportunity to challenge the reigning world lightweight champion Joe Gans on September 3, 1906, in Goldfield, Nevada. Gans dropped Nelson repeatedly during the bout, but could not knock him out. Finally, in the forty-second round, Nelson hit Gans below the belt causing him to lose the fight by disqualification .

In 1907 and 1908, Nelson split a pair of bouts with Britt and fought Attell to a draw. He then challenged Gans again for the world lightweight title on July 4, 1908. This time he knocked Gans out in the seventeenth round. Two months later, Nelson knocked out Gans in the twenty-first round.

In 1909, Nelson fought Ad Wolgast in a fight held over the lightweight limit. Wolgast beat him, and Nelson gave Wolgast a chance at his title on February 22, 1910. Eventually unable to see due to the accumulation of punches, Nelson lost the title when the referee stopped the fight in either the fortieth or the forty-second round.

Nelson continued to fight, and in 1917, he challenged Freddie Welsh for the lightweight title. He lost a twelve-round decision and retired from fighting in 1920.

He was elected to the International Boxing Hall of Fame in 1992.

In 2016, award-winning biographer Mark Allen Baker  published the first comprehensive biography on Nelson with McFarland, a leading independent publisher of academic and nonfiction books.

Motion pictures of Nelson's fights

The second Gans-Nelson battle in Colma was the subject of a four-reel motion picture that played in major cities around the country.

Professional boxing record
All information in this section is derived from BoxRec, unless otherwise stated.

Official record

All newspaper decisions are officially regarded as “no decision” bouts and are not counted in the win/loss/draw column.

Unofficial record

Record with the inclusion of newspaper decisions in the win/loss/draw column.

See also
 Lineal championship

References

External links

 
 International Boxing Hall of Fame Site
 findagrave.com

|-

1882 births
1954 deaths
Lightweight boxers
World lightweight boxing champions
Boxers from Chicago
Danish male boxers
American male boxers
Sportspeople from Copenhagen
Danish emigrants to the United States